"Rigor Mortis" is a song by the funk band Cameo, released on April 20, 1977 in their debut album Cardiac Arrest.  In the US, the song peaked at #33 on the Hot Soul Singles chart.  In this instance "Rigor Mortis" is a euphemism for being lonesome on the dance floor.

In the media
 "Rigor Mortis" was sampled in Brand Nubian's song '"Brand Nubian".
 DJ Quik sampled "Rigor Mortis" for his song entitled, "Get At Me".

References

Cameo (band) songs
1977 singles
1977 songs
Songs written by Larry Blackmon